A pig in a poke is a thing that is bought without first being inspected, and thus of unknown authenticity or quality. The idiom is attested in 1555:
I wyll neuer bye the pyg in the poke
Thers many a foule pyg in a feyre cloke A "poke" is a bag, so the image is of a concealed item being sold.

Starting in the 19th century, this idiom was explained as a confidence trick where a farmer would substitute a cat for a suckling pig when bringing it to market. When the buyer discovered the deception, he was said to "let the cat out of the bag", that is, to learn of something unfortunate prematurely,  hence the expression "letting the cat out of the bag", meaning to reveal that which is secret. The French idiom acheter (un) chat en poche and the Dutch een kat in de zak kopen and also the German die Katze im Sack kaufen (all: to buy a cat in a bag) refer to an actual scam of this nature, as do many other European equivalents, while the English expression refers to the appearance of the trick. The English idiom "sold a pup" refers to a similar con.

In common law, buyers have the right to inspect goods before purchase.

Etymology
A poke is a sack or bag, from French poque, which is also the etymon of "pocket", "pouch", and "poach". Poke is still in regional use.  Pigs were formerly brought to market for sale in a cloth bag, a poke.

Relation to other idioms and expressions
The English colloquialisms such as turn out to be a pig in a poke or buy a pig in a poke mean that something is sold or bought without the buyer knowing its true nature or value, especially when buying without inspecting the item beforehand. The phrase can also be applied to accepting an idea or plan without a full understanding of its basis. Similar expressions exist in other European languages, most of them referring to the purchase of a cat in a bag.

Use in popular culture
In the April 1929 edition of the literary magazine London Aphrodite, a story by Rhys Davies, titled "A Pig in a Poke", was published, in which a Welsh coal miner takes a woman from London for his wife and regrets it. (Boulton 1993: p. 278)

In the 1985 film National Lampoon's European Vacation, the Griswold family wins the vacation on a game show called "Pig in a Poke".

See also

 Cultural references to pigs
 Green goods scam
 Lipstick on a pig
 Impulse purchase

References

Bibliography 

 E. Cobham Brewer, Dictionary of Phrase and Fable. 1898.
 Funk, Charles Earle, A Hog on Ice: & Other Curious Expressions. HarperResource, 2002.  .

Confidence tricks
Deception
English-language idioms
Metaphors referring to pigs